Bernard May MHK (born 6 July 1941) is a British politician and entrepreneur, who was a Member of the House of Keys in the Isle of Man and Government Minister.

Early life and career
Born on 6 July 1941 to Harry Turner May and Lilian Freda (née Nicholl) in Hyde, Cheshire, he was raised on the Isle of Man and educated at Douglas High School. He later went on to own and operate a taxi company on the island and was also a member of Douglas Town Council before he was elected as a Member of the House of Keys for Douglas North in 1985 for the Manx Labour Party.  He was re-elected in 1986 and 1991 before losing to John Houghton in 1996, following which he became a bus driver. In 1998, he unsuccessfully stood again.

Personal life
He has been married to Carol (née Mander) since 1969, and they have 3 children together.

Governmental positions
Chairman of Isle of Man Post Office, 1986–88
Minister of Industry, 1988–91
Minister of Health and Social Security, 1991–96

References

Members of the House of Keys 1981–1986
Members of the House of Keys 1986–1991
Members of the House of Keys 1991–1996
English businesspeople
Manx businesspeople
20th-century English politicians
20th-century Manx politicians
Manx Labour Party politicians
1941 births
Living people